The 2019 IIHF Women's World Championship Division II was three international ice hockey tournaments organised by the International Ice Hockey Federation. The Division II Group A tournament was played in Dumfries, Great Britain, from 2 to 8 April 2019, the Division II Group B tournament was played in Brașov, Romania, from 1 to 7 April 2019, and the Division II Group B Qualification tournament was played in Cape Town, South Africa, from 13 to 18 January 2019.

Slovenia earned promotion in Division II Group A; Chinese Taipei won the Division II Group B and Ukraine the qualification tournament, both teams got promoted for the next year, while Australia and Romania were relegated.

Division II Group A

Participants

Match officials
4 referees and 7 linesmen were selected for the tournament.

Final standings

Results
All times are local (UTC+1).

Awards and statistics

Awards
Best players selected by the directorate:
Best Goalkeeper:  Pia Dukarič
Best Defenseman:  Hwang Chung-gum
Best Forward:  Pia Pren
Source: IIHF.com

Scoring leaders
List shows the top skaters sorted by points, then goals.

GP = Games played; G = Goals; A = Assists; Pts = Points; +/− = Plus/minus; PIM = Penalties in minutes; POS = Position
Source: IIHF.com

Leading goaltenders
Only the top five goaltenders, based on save percentage, who have played at least 40% of their team's minutes, are included in this list.

TOI = Time on ice (minutes:seconds); SA = Shots against; GA = Goals against; GAA = Goals against average; Sv% = Save percentage; SO = Shutouts
Source: IIHF.com

Division II Group B

Participants

Match officials
4 referees and 7 linesmen were selected for the tournament.

Final standings

Results
All times are local (UTC+3).

Awards and statistics

Awards
Best players selected by the directorate:
Best Goalkeeper:  Hsu Tzu-ting
Best Defenseman:  Krystie Woodyear-Smith
Best Forward:  Silvia Björgvinsdóttir
Source: IIHF.com

Scoring leaders
List shows the top skaters sorted by points, then goals.

GP = Games played; G = Goals; A = Assists; Pts = Points; +/− = Plus/minus; PIM = Penalties in minutes; POS = Position
Source: IIHF.com

Leading goaltenders
Only the top five goaltenders, based on save percentage, who have played at least 40% of their team's minutes, are included in this list.

TOI = Time on ice (minutes:seconds); SA = Shots against; GA = Goals against; GAA = Goals against average; Sv% = Save percentage; SO = Shutouts
Source: IIHF.com

Division II Group B Qualification

Participants

Match officials
3 referees and 5 linesmen were selected for the tournament.

Final standings

Results
All times are local (UTC+2).

Awards and statistics

Awards
Best players selected by the directorate:
Best Goalkeeper:  Viktoriia Tkachenko
Best Defenseman:  Donne van Doesburgh
Best Forward:  Lotte De Guchtenaere
Source: IIHF.com

Scoring leaders
List shows the top skaters sorted by points, then goals.

GP = Games played; G = Goals; A = Assists; Pts = Points; +/− = Plus/minus; PIM = Penalties in minutes; POS = Position
Source: IIHF.com

Leading goaltenders
Only the top five goaltenders, based on save percentage, who have played at least 40% of their team's minutes, are included in this list.

TOI = Time on ice (minutes:seconds); SA = Shots against; GA = Goals against; GAA = Goals against average; Sv% = Save percentage; SO = Shutouts
Source: IIHF.com

References

External links
Official website of IIHF

2019
Division II
2019 IIHF World Championship Division II
2019 IIHF World Championship Division II
2019 IIHF World Championship Division II
Sport in Dumfries
Sport in Brașov
Sports competitions in Cape Town
Ice
Ice
Ice
IIHF
IIHF
IIHF